Cassinia laevis, commonly known as cough bush, dead finish, curry bush or rosemary bush, is a species of flowering plant in the family Asteraceae and is endemic to south-eastern continental Australia. It is a shrub with a curry-like odour, crowded linear leaves, and heads of creamy-white flowers arranged in panicles.

Description
The upper surface of the leaves is shiny but the lower surface has fine hairs although obscured by the rolled edges of the leaf.

Taxonomy
Cassinia laevis was first formally described in 1818 by Robert Brown in the Transactions of the Linnean Society of London. The specific epithet (aculeata) means "smooth".

Distribution and habitat
Cassinia laevis is widespread in Queensland, New South Wales and eastern South Australia. There are also records from the Northern Territory. It grows in a wide variety of habitats, often on stony ridges and often in mallee.

References

laevis
Asterales of Australia
Flora of New South Wales
Flora of South Australia
Flora of Queensland
Flora of the Northern Territory
Plants described in 1818
Taxa named by Robert Brown (botanist, born 1773)